The term Australian megafauna refers to the megafauna in Australia during the Pleistocene Epoch. Most of these species became extinct during the latter half of the Pleistocene, and the roles of human and climatic factors in their extinction are contested.

There are similarities between the prehistoric Australian megafauna and some mythical creatures from the Aboriginal Dreamtime.

Causes of extinction

Many modern researchers, including Tim Flannery, think that with the arrival of early Aboriginal Australians (around 70,000~65,000 years ago), hunting and the use of fire to manage their environment may have contributed to the extinction of the megafauna. Increased aridity during peak glaciation (about 18,000 years ago) may have also contributed, but most of the megafauna were already extinct by this time. Others, including Steve Wroe, note that records in the Australian Pleistocene are rare, and there is not enough data to definitively determine the time of extinction of many of the species, with many of the species having no confirmed record within the last 100,000 years. They suggest that many of the extinctions had been staggered over the course of the late Middle Pleistocene and early Late Pleistocene, prior to human arrival, due to climatic stress.

New evidence based on accurate optically stimulated luminescence and uranium-thorium dating of megafaunal remains suggests that humans were the ultimate cause of the extinction for some of the megafauna in Australia. The dates derived show that all forms of megafauna on the Australian mainland became extinct in the same rapid timeframe—approximately 46,000 years ago—the period when the earliest humans first arrived in Australia (around 70,000~65,000 years ago long chronology and 50,000 years ago short chronology). However, these results were subsequently disputed, with another study showing that 50 of 88 megafaunal species have no dates postdating the penultimate glacial maxiumum around 130,000 years ago, and there was only firm evidence for overlap of 8-14 megafaunal species with people. Analysis of oxygen and carbon isotopes from teeth of megafauna indicate the regional climates at the time of extinction were similar to arid regional climates of today and that the megafauna were well adapted to arid climates. The dates derived have been interpreted as suggesting that the main mechanism for extinction was human burning of a landscape that was then much less fire-adapted; oxygen and carbon isotopes of teeth indicate sudden, drastic, non-climate-related changes in vegetation and in the diet of surviving marsupial species. However, early Aboriginal peoples appear to have rapidly eliminated the megafauna of Tasmania about 41,000 years ago (following formation of a land bridge to Australia about 43,000 years ago as Ice Age sea levels declined) without using fire to modify the environment there, implying that at least in this case hunting was the most important factor. It has also been suggested that the vegetational changes that occurred on the mainland were a consequence, rather than a cause, of the elimination of the megafauna. This idea is supported by sediment cores from Lynch's Crater in Queensland, which suggest that fire increased in the local ecosystem about a century after the disappearance of Sporormiella (a fungus found in herbivorous animal dung used as a megafaunal proxy), leading to a subsequent transition to fire-tolerant sclerophyll vegetation. However, the use of Sporormiella as a megafaunal proxy has been criticised, noting that Sporormiella is found sporadically in the dung of various herbivorous species, including extant emus and kangaroos, not just megafauna, that its presence depends on a variety of factors, often unrelated to megafaunal abundance, and that in Cuddie Springs, a well known megafaunal site, the densities of Sporormiella were consistently low. A study of extinct megafauna at the Walker Creek site in Queensland, found that their disappearance from the site after 40 kya came after an extended period of environmental deterioration.

Chemical analysis of fragments of eggshells of Genyornis newtoni, a flightless bird that became extinct in Australia, from over 200 sites, revealed scorch marks consistent with cooking in human-made fires, presumably the first direct evidence of human contribution to the extinction of a species of the Australian megafauna. This was later contested by another study that noted the too small dimensions (126 x 97 mm, roughly like the emu eggs, while the moa eggs were about 240 mm) for the Genyornis supposed eggs, and rather, attributed them to another extinct, but much smaller bird, the megapode Progura. The real time that saw Genyornis vanish is still an open question, but this was believed as one of the best documented megafauna extinctions in Australia.

"Imperceptive overkill"; a scenario where anthropogenic pressures take place; slowly and gradually wiping the megafauna out; has been suggested.

On the other hand, there is also evidence to suggest that (contrary to other conclusions) the megafauna lived alongside humans for several thousand years. The question of if (and how) the megafauna died before the arrival of humans is still debated; with some authors maintaining that only a minority of such fauna remained by the time the first humans settled on the mainland. One of the most important advocates of human role, Tim Flannery, author of the book Future Eaters, was also heavily criticised for his conclusions. A surprisingly late date of 33-37 kya is known for a Zygomaturus specimen from the Willandra Lakes Region in New South Wales, the latest known date for any Australian Megafauna. This is well after aboriginal arrival in Australia around 50 kya.

A 2021 study found that the rate of extinction of Australia's megafauna is rather unusual, with some more generalistic species having gone extinct earlier while highly specialised ones having become extinct later or even still surviving today. A mosaic cause of extinction with different anthropogenic and environmental pressures was proposed.

Living Australian megafauna 
The term "megafauna" is usually applied to large animals (over ).

Mammals 

 The eastern grey kangaroos (Macropus giganteus).
Common wombats (Vombatus ursinus) can reach . They thrive in Eastern Australia and Tasmania, preferring temperate forests and highland regions.

Birds 

 The emu (Dromaius novaehollandiae)
 The southern cassowary (Casuarius casuarius)

Reptiles 

 Goannas, being predatory lizards, are often quite large or bulky, with sharp teeth and claws. However, not all goannas are gargantuan: pygmy goannas may be smaller than a man's arm. 
An  saltwater crocodile was reportedly shot on the Norman River of Queensland in 1957; a cast was made of it and is on display as a popular tourist attraction. However, due to the lack of solid evidence (other than the plaster replica), and the length of time since the crocodile was caught, it is not considered "official".
 The freshwater crocodile (Crocodylus johnsoni) is a relatively small crocodilian. In places such as Lake Argyle and Nitmiluk National Park (Katherine Gorge), there exist a handful of confirmed 4 m (13 ft) individuals.

Extinct Australian megafauna 

The following is an incomplete list of extinct Australian megafauna (monotremes, marsupials, birds and reptiles) in the format:

 Latin name, (common name, period alive), and a brief description.

Monotremes 
Monotremes are arranged by size with the largest at the top.

 Murrayglossus hacketti was a sheep-sized echidna uncovered in Mammoth Cave in Western Australia, and is the largest monotreme so far uncovered.
 Megalibgwilia ramsayi was a large, long-beaked echidna with powerful forelimbs for digging.

Marsupials 
Marsupials are arranged by size, with the largest at the top.

Diprotodon optatum is not only the largest known species of diprotodontid, but also the largest known marsupial to ever exist. It is the only marsupial known, living or extinct, to have conducted seasonal migrations.
 Palorchestes azael was a diprotodontoid similar in size to Zygomaturus. It had long claws to grasp branches with. It lived during the Pleistocene.

Euowenia grata
 Euryzygoma dunense
It appears to have lived in wetlands, using two fork-like incisors to shovel up reeds and sedges for food.
 Macropus pearsoni and M. ferragus
 Mukupirna nambensis, in its own family Mukupirnidae within the Vombatiformes suborder of the large marsupial order Diprotodontia
 Nototherium was a diprotodontoid relative of the larger Diprotodon.
 Phascolonus gigas
 Procoptodon goliah (the giant short-faced kangaroo) is the largest-known kangaroo to have ever lived.
 Procoptodon rapha, P. pusio and P. texasensis
 Protemnodon, a genus of wallaby with four known giant species out of 11 known species
 Palorchestes parvus
 Ramsayia magna
 Sthenurus tindalei and S. atlas
 Thylacoleo carnifex (the marsupial lion) is the largest known carnivorous mammal to have ever lived in prehistoric Australia, and was of comparable size to female placental mammal lions and tigers, It had a catlike skull with large slicing pre-molars, a retractable thumb-claw and massive forelimbs. It was almost certainly carnivorous and a tree-dweller.

Simosthenurus pales
 Phascolarctos stirtoni (the giant koala) was similar in structure to the modern koala (P. cinereus), but one-third larger.
 Phascolomys medius
 Lasiorhinus angustidens
 Thylacinus cynocephalus (the thylacine, Tasmanian wolf or Tasmanian tiger)
 Congruus congruus, a wallaby from Naracoorte
 Troposodon minor
 Sthenurus oreas
 Simosthenurus occidentalis (another sthenurine) was about as tall as a modern eastern grey kangaroo, but much more robust. It is one of the nine known species of leaf-eating kangaroos identified in fossils found in Naracoorte Caves National Park.
 Simothenurus brownei
 Propleopus oscillans (the giant rat-kangaroo) was a large (about  rat-kangaroo with large shearing and stout grinding teeth that indicate it may have been an opportunistic omnivore able to eat invertebrates, vertebrates (possibly carrion), fruits, and soft leaves.
 Simothenurus maddocki
 Sthenurus andersoni
 Vombatus hacketti
 Macropus thor
 Macropus piltonensis
 Macropus rama
 Simothenurus gilli
 Warrendja wakefieldi, a wombat from Naracoorte
 Sarcophilus harrisii laniarius, a large subspecies of the Tasmanian devil.
 Thylacinus megiriani

Birds 

 Family Dromornithidae: this group of birds was more closely related to modern fowl than to modern ratites.
It is one of the largest birds so far discovered. It inhabited subtropical open woodlands and was probably herbivorous with some omnivory. It was heavier than the moa and taller than the elephant birds.
 Dromornis (formerly Bullockornis) planei (the "demon duck of doom") was another huge member of the Dromornithidae.
 Genyornis newtoni (the mihirung) was related to Dromornis, and was about the height of an ostrich. It was the last survivor of the Dromornithidae. It had a large lower jaw and was probably herbivorous with some omnivory.
 Progura gallinacea (the giant malleefowl) was a larger relative of the extant malleefowl (Leipoa ocellata).

Reptiles 

Giant goannas and humans overlapped in time in Pleistocene Australia, but there is no evidence that they directly encountered each other.
It was an ambush predator living at waterholes located in natural sun traps and killed its prey by constriction.
It had long legs positioned underneath its body, and chased down mammals, birds and other reptiles for food. Its teeth were blade-like for cutting rather than pointed for gripping, as with water-dwelling crocodiles. It belonged to the mekosuchine subfamily (all now extinct). It was discovered at the Bluff Downs in Queensland.
It hunted mammals, birds and reptiles in riparian woodlands. It is most similar to the extant olive python (Liasis olivacea).

Extinct megafauna contemporaneous with Aboriginal Australians 
Monsters and large animals in Dreamtime stories have been associated with extinct megafauna.

The association was made at least as early as 1845, with colonists writing that Aboriginal people identified Diprotodon bones as belonging to bunyips, and Thomas Worsnop concluding that the fear of bunyip attacks at watering holes remembered a time when Diprotodon lived in marshes.

In the early 1900s, John Walter Gregory outlined the Kadimakara (or Kuddimurka or Kadimerkera) story of the Diyari (similar stories being told by nearby peoples), which describes the deserts of Central Australia as having once been "fertile, well-watered plains" with giant gum trees, and almost solid cloud cover overhead. The trees created a roof of vegetation in which lived the strange monsters called Kadimakara—which sometimes came to the ground to eat. One time, the gum trees were destroyed, forcing the Kadimakara to remain on the ground, particularly Lake Eyre and Kalamurina, until they died.

In times of drought and flood, the Diyari performed corroborees (including dances and blood sacrifices) at the bones of the Kadimakara to appease them and request that they intercede with the spirits of rain and clouds. Sites of Kadimakara bones identified by Aboriginal people corresponded with megafauna fossil sites, and an Aboriginal guide identified a Diprotodon jaw as belonging to the Kadimakara.

Gregory speculated that the story could be a remnant from when the Diyari lived elsewhere, or when the geographical conditions of Central Australia were different. The latter possibility would indicate Aboriginal coexistence with megafauna, with Gregory saying:

After examining fossils, Gregory concluded that the story was a combination of the two factors, but that the environment of Lake Eyre had probably not changed much since Aboriginal habitation. He concluded that while some references to Kadimakara were probably memories of the crocodiles once found in Lake Eyre, others that describe a "big, heavy land animal, with a single horn on its forehead" were probably references to Diprotodon.

Geologist Michael Welland describes from across Australia Dreamtime "tales of giant creatures that roamed the lush landscape until aridity came and they finally perished in the desiccated marshes of Kati Thanda–Lake Eyre", giving as examples the Kadimakara of Lake Eye, as well as continent-wide stories of the Rainbow Serpent, which he says corresponds with Wonambi naracoortensis.

Journalist Peter Hancock speculates in The Crocodile That Wasn't that a Dreamtime story from the Perth area could be a memory of Varanus priscus. However, the story in question details dingoes attacking or frightening off the alleged V. priscus, when the giant lizard died out nearly 46,000 years before the accepted arrival date of dingoes.

Rock art in the Kimberley region appears to depict a marsupial lion and a marsupial tapir, as does Arnhem land art. Arnhem art also appears to depict Genyornis, a bird that is believed to have gone extinct 40,000 years ago.

An Early Triassic archosauromorph found in Queensland, Kadimakara australiensis, is named after the Kadimakara.

See also 

List of Australian animals extinct in the Holocene

Hulitherium and Maokopia (Diprotodontoids inhabited New Guinea during the Pleistocene)
 (Believed to have evolved in Australia)

References

 
 
 Long, J.A., Archer, M. Flannery, T.F. & Hand, S. (2003). Prehistoric Mammals of Australia and New Guinea −100 Million Years of Evolution. Johns Hopkins University Press, Baltimore. 242 pp.
 Molnar, R. (2004). Dragons in the Dust: The Paleobiology of the Giant Lizard Megalania. Indiana University Press. p. 127.

External links 
 Cuddie Springs
 Interview with Dr John Long, curator at the Museum of Victoria
 Naracoorte caves in South Australia
 Humans, not climate change, wiped out Australian megafauna. Phys.org, January 20, 2017.

Mega
Prehistoric animals of Australia
Lists of largest animals